Robert Sherman (born July 1932) is an American radio broadcaster, author, music critic, writer, and educator. He achieved success as a host of such radio programs as the folk music program Woody’s Children and The Listening Room, which were broadcast by WQXR in New York City. As an author, Sherman has been a music critic and columnist for The New York Times for more than forty years as well as writing numerous books, including two bestsellers he co-authored with pianist and comedian Victor Borge. He is the author of the book The Complete Idiot's Guide to Classical Music, published in 1997. He has served at the faculty of the Juilliard School for nearly twenty years.

Career

Sherman, born to famous pianist Nadia Reisenberg (and the nephew of noted thereminist Clara Rockmore) began his broadcasting career at the radio station WQXR in New York City as a typist-clerk, eventually working  his way up to being a program director and then senior consultant. In 1969, he began hosting the popular radio folk program Woody’s Children. In 1970, The Listening Room debuted with Sherman as host, and was picked up to be nationally broadcast.

Sherman soon extended his talents to the television format when he began hosting the program Vibrations on PBS and Camera Three on CBS, both in 1972. During this time, he continued working at WQXR, hosting several more radio programs from the late 1970s to the 2000s.

In 1964, Sherman began contributing regularly to The New York Times as both a music columnist and critic and in 1969, he began his career as a lecturer and educator at New York University, teaching there for almost twenty years. In 1971 and 1980, respectively, Sherman published two bestselling books: My Favorite Intermissions and My Favorite Comedies in Music, in collaboration with Victor Borge.

Robert Sherman is also a concert narrator for such groups as the Greenwich Symphony and Canadian Brass. He serves on the advisory boards of a multitude of cultural organizations, where he performs such duties as competition judge, pre-concert lecturer, panel moderator, and fundraising emcee. He hosts the Lincoln Center for the Performing Arts presentation of the annual Avery Fisher Career Grants and hosts and produces the McGraw-Hill Companies' Young Artists Showcase.

Other ventures

Sherman has spent many years preserving the memories of both his mother, the pianist Nadia Reisenberg, and his aunt, noted thereminist Clara Rockmore, through the management of biographies, memorial events, and the writing of commentaries on their recordings. In collaboration with his brother, Alexander Sherman, Robert Sherman has completed the project of releasing a book about his mother, entitled Nadia Reisenberg: A Musician's Scrapbook, which was published by The International Piano Archives in Maryland in 1986. Sherman was also a part of Clara Rockmore's Lost Theremin Album release in 2006 on Bridge Records.

References

External links
 Robert Sherman Collection - Special Collections in Performing Arts, University of Maryland, College Park
 Woody's Children Radio official website

1932 births
Living people
American music critics
Place of birth missing (living people)
Juilliard School faculty
Critics employed by The New York Times
Educators from New York City
WFUV people